The 1978 NCAA Division I baseball tournament was played at the end of the 1978 NCAA Division I baseball season to determine the national champion of college baseball.  The tournament concluded with eight teams competing in the College World Series, a double-elimination tournament in its thirty-second year.  Eight regional competitions were held to determine the participants in the final event.  Seven regions held a four team, double-elimination tournament while one region included six teams, resulting in 34 teams participating in the tournament at the conclusion of their regular season, and in some cases, after a conference tournament.  The thirty-second tournament's champion was Southern California, coached by Rod Dedeaux.  The Most Outstanding Player was Rod Boxberger of Southern California.

Regionals
The opening rounds of the tournament were played across eight regional sites across the country, seven consisting of four teams and one of six teams. The winners of each District advanced to the College World Series.

Bold indicates winner.

Atlantic Regional at Coral Gables, FL
{{4Team2ElimBracket
| RD1=
| RD2=
| RD3=

| RD1-seed1=
| RD1-team1=
| RD1-score1=4
| RD1-seed2=
| RD1-team2=| RD1-score2=0

| RD1-seed3=
| RD1-team3=| RD1-score3=8| RD1-seed4=
| RD1-team4=Miami (FL)
| RD1-score4=5

| RD1-seed5=
| RD1-team5=Florida State
| RD1-score5=2
| RD1-seed6=
| RD1-team6=Miami (FL)| RD1-score6=7| RD2-seed1=
| RD2-team1=Marshall| RD2-score1=9| RD2-seed2=
| RD2-team2=Clemson
| RD2-score2=3

| RD2-seed3=
| RD2-team3=Clemson
| RD2-score3=5
| RD2-seed4=
| RD2-team4=Miami (FL)| RD2-score4=7| RD3-seed1=
| RD3-team1=Marshall
| RD3-score1-1=0
| RD3-score1-2=1
| RD3-seed2=
| RD3-team2=Miami (FL)| RD3-score2-1=6| RD3-score2-2=5}}

Mideast Regional at Ann Arbor, MI

Midwest Regional at Tulsa, OK

Northeast Regional at Holyoke, MA

Rocky Mountain Regional at Tempe, AZ

South Regional at Auburn, AL

South Central Regional at Arlington, TX

West Regional at Los Angeles, CA

College World Series

Participants

Results

Bracket

Game results

All-Tournament Team
The following players were members of the All-Tournament Team.

Notable players
 Arizona State: Jamie Allen, Chris Bando, Hubie Brooks, Bob Horner, Dave Hudgens
 Baylor: Andy Beene, Jaime Cocanower, Fritzie Connally, Jon Perlman
 Miami (FL): Tony Brewer
 Michigan: Steve Howe, Rick Leach
 North Carolina: Dwight Lowry, Mike Fox
 Oral Roberts: George Bjorkman, Ron Meridith
 Southern California: Bill Bordley, Dave Engle, Dave Hostetler, Jeff Schattinger, Bob Skube, Chris Smith, Tim Tolman, Dave Van Gorder
 St. John's: Michael Beatrice, Doug LaTrenta'''

Tournament notes
Chris Bando appears in his fourth College World Series.

See also
 1978 NCAA Division II baseball tournament
 1978 NCAA Division III baseball tournament
 1978 NAIA World Series

References

NCAA Division I Baseball Championship
1978 NCAA Division I baseball season
NCAA Division I Baseball
Baseball in the Dallas–Fort Worth metroplex